Otto Dahl (16 June 1914 – 16 January 1978) was a Norwegian politician for the Labour Party.

He was elected to the Norwegian Parliament from Hedmark in 1954, and was re-elected on three occasions.

Dahl was born in Hamar and involved in local politics in Hamar municipality from 1945 to 1959.

References

1914 births
1978 deaths
Labour Party (Norway) politicians
Members of the Storting
20th-century Norwegian politicians
Politicians from Hamar